An equally spaced polynomial (ESP) is a polynomial used in finite fields, specifically GF(2) (binary).

An s-ESP of degree sm can be written as:

 for 

or

Properties
Over GF(2) the ESP has many interesting properties, including:
 The Hamming weight of the ESP is m + 1.

A 1-ESP is known as an all one polynomial and has additional properties including the above.

References

Field (mathematics)
Polynomials